Mihail Celarianu (August 1, 1893 – 1985) was a Romanian poet and novelist.

A native of Bucharest, he was the third of eight children born to Constantin Celarianu, an officer in the Romanian Army, and his wife Antoaneta (née Pricup). After middle and high school in Bucharest and Brăila, he took a technical course of study at the Bucharest Conservatory, hoping to launch a career in vocal music, an idea he abandoned. Celarianu spent two years in Paris (1912-1914) studying medicine, returning home upon the outbreak of World War I. (His 1936 novel Femeia sângelui meu, which he considered "almost entirely autobiographical", would deal with this period; he was accused of immorality when it was published.) He enlisted for duty after Romania entered the war in 1916, first as an infantryman and then, after attending the Pipera-based bombardiers' school, as an air gunner. The war inspired his play Drapelul, which was staged in Onești, as well as a lengthy episode in his 1940 novel Diamant verde.

From 1923 to 1929, Celarianu worked as a civil servant at Ion Minulescu's office in the Arts and Religious Affairs Ministry, an experience that informed his 1934 novel Polca pe furate, published on the recommendation of Mihail Sebastian. From 1929 to 1944, he was librarian and then specialist at the Labor, Health and Social Protection Ministry, where one of his office colleagues was Felix Aderca. Between 1944 and 1949, he was secretary of the fellow-travelling Democratic Writers' Union. His wife Nina was the daughter of Alexandru Macedonski, whose poems he selected and published in 1920 as Poezii alese.

He made his poetry debut in Duminica in 1906, aged thirteen. His first book, Poeme și proză, appeared in 1913, during his Paris stay. He was a regular customer of the Oteteleșeanu Restaurant and, following a suggestion by Tudor Vianu, began frequenting the Eugen Lovinescu-led Sburătorul circle. He wrote two children's books (Zâna izvorului sănătății, together with Jean Bart and Dr. Ygrec, 1936; Isprăvile lui Stan cel cuminte, 1939), as well as a volume of humorous sketches, Noaptea de fericire (1944). He translated Honoré de Balzac, Boris Polevoy (in collaboration) and Édouard de Keyser. Magazines that publish his work include Sburătorul, Universul literar, Flacăra, Viața Românească, Revista Fundațiilor Regale and România Literară. He won the Romanian Writers' Society Prize in 1929, 1935 and 1939; and the Romanian Academy's Mihai Eminescu Prize in 1966. During the interwar period, Celarianu was a promoter of novels that analyzed situations through satire and especially eroticism. He was a Symbolist poet of the elegiac and sensual or erotic tendency, as exemplified by his volumes Drumul (1928) and Flori fără pace (1938).

Notes

1893 births
1985 deaths
Writers from Bucharest
Romanian male poets
Symbolist poets
Romanian dramatists and playwrights
Romanian children's writers
Romanian humorists
Romanian translators
Romanian civil servants
Romanian librarians
Romanian military personnel of World War I
20th-century Romanian poets
20th-century Romanian novelists
20th-century Romanian dramatists and playwrights
20th-century translators
20th-century Romanian male writers